Bakır station is a station just north of the village of Selvili, Turkey. Bakır station consists of a single platform serving one track, with two other tracks serving as siding tracks. TCDD Taşımacılık operates a daily train, the Karesi Express, from İzmir to Balıkesir.

The station was opened in 1890, by the Smyrna Cassaba Railway.

References

External links
Station timetable

Railway stations in Manisa Province
Railway stations opened in 1890
1890 establishments in the Ottoman Empire
Akhisar District